Arkansas Highway 189 (AR 189, Ark. 189, and Hwy. 189) is the designation for a state highway in the U.S. state of Arkansas. The route is split into four sections, all of which are located in southeast Arkansas. The first section is a very short highway that begins at US Highway 425 (US 425) in Hamburg and travels to the Ashley County Fairgrounds just south of Hamburg. The third section begins at US 278 in Warren and ends at US 63 in Warren.

Route description

Section 1 

The first section of AR 189 begins at US 425 in Hamburg, and runs from east to west, rather than north to south. The route heads directly towards the west before reaching its western terminus at the Ashley County Fairgrounds just south of Hamburg.

Section 2 

The second section of AR 189 begins at US 425, US 82, and AR 8 in Hamburg. The route heads west and eventually towards the northwest before reaching its northern terminus at AR 133 near Milo.

Section 3 

The third section of AR 189 begins at US 278 in Warren. The route heads towards the northwest for about  before reaching its northern terminus at US 63 just north of Warren. The route is a bypass around the city of Warren and does not intersect any other highways or communities.

Section 4 

The fourth and longest section of AR 189 begins at AR 8 near Orlando. The route travels north for about  before running concurrently with AR 97 for about  through the town of Kingsland. The route intersects US 79 shortly after and continues to head northwest before reaching its northern terminus at Pump Station Road in rural Cleveland County.

Major intersections

References

External links 

189
 Transportation in Ashley County, Arkansas
 Transportation in Bradley County, Arkansas
 Transportation in Cleveland County, Arkansas